Payne Lake is a lake in Alberta, Canada.

References

External links
 Payne Lake Provincial Recreation Area

Cardston County
Payne Lake